An adapter or adaptor is a device that converts attributes of one electrical device or system to those of an otherwise incompatible device or system. Some modify power or signal attributes, while others merely adapt the physical form of one connector to another.

Travel adapters
Many countries with ties to Europe use 230-volt, 50 Hz AC mains electricity, using a variety of power plugs and sockets. Difficulty arises when moving an electrical device between countries that use different sockets. A passive electric power adapter, sometimes called a travel plug or travel adapter, allows using a plug from one region with a foreign socket. As other countries supply 120-volt, 60 Hz AC, using a travel adapter in a country with a different supply poses a safety hazard if the connected device does not support both input voltages.

AC-to-DC adapters

An AC-to-DC power supply adapts electricity from household mains voltage (either 120 or 230 volts AC) to low-voltage DC suitable for powering consumer electronics. Small, detached power supplies for consumer electronics are called AC adapters, or variously power bricks, wall warts, or chargers.

Computer adapters

A host controller connects a computer to a peripheral device, such as a storage device, network, or human interface device. As a host controller can also be viewed as bridging the protocols used on the buses between peripheral and computer, and internally to the computer, it is also called a host bus adapter. Likewise, specific types may be called adapters: a network interface controller may be called a network adapter, and a graphics card a display adapter.

Adapters (sometimes called dongles) allow connecting a peripheral device with one plug to a different jack on the computer. They are often used to connect modern devices to a legacy port on an old system, or legacy devices to a modern port. Such adapters may be entirely passive, or contain active circuitry.

A common type is a USB adapter.

One kind of serial port adapter enables connections between 25-contact and nine-contact connectors, but does not affect electrical power- and signalling-related attributes.

Software adapters

In software, an adapter is a piece of code that complies with an interface of an existing component while actually using another implementation.

See also 
AC power plugs and sockets
Dongle (includes all sorts of adapters)
Power strip
Repurposing

References

Electrical components